Hanover High School is a high school located in the Mechanicsville census-designated place (CDP) of unincorporated Hanover County, Virginia, United States. The school opened during the 2003–04 academic year with Carol Cash as principal. The second principal of the school was George Sadler, who took on the role when Cash retired in 2007. Sadler retired from the role at the end of the 2011–2012 school year. Dana Gresham joined the school as principal in July 2012 after serving as a principal at Rural Point Elementary School. Kristina Reece became principal in the 2015–2016 school year.

It is an International Baccalaureate sponsored school. 

The Hawk Eye is the school newspaper that was established when the school was opened. Eleven issues of the free newspaper are produced each year.

Athletics  
Virginia High School League Division 4A team in Region 4B (previously Central Region).
Baseball
Basketball (boys)
Basketball (girls)
Cheering
Cross Country
Track & Field- 2018 Region 4B Girls Outdoor Track Champions
Field Hockey (girls)
Football Coach Joshua Just led the Varsity football team from 2004 to 2013. Derek Stoudt replaced Just as the Varsity head coach. The short history of the team has not had a stable reputation with wins and losses changing drastically from season to season; in 2005, they lost every single game but five years later in 2010, they went almost undefeated, losing only one game. Sam Rogers started as a quarterback all four years of his high school career. He led the team to two county championships and three Central Region championships. In 2013, Rogers went on to play for the Virginia Tech Hokies and in the 2017 NFL Draft, the L.A. Rams selected him as the 206th overall pick. The Hawks have won over half of the Playoffs they played in since 2006. The student section of the stands at the football games is called the ‘Hawk's Nest,’ whose biggest competition is Atlee High School's ‘Rage Cage.’
Golf
Gymnastics
Lacrosse (boys)
Lacrosse (girls)
Soccer (boys)
Soccer (girls)
Softball
Swimming
Tennis (boys)
Tennis (girls)
Volleyball (boys)
Volleyball (girls)
Wrestling

Student Activities

7th Up
Battle of the Brains
National Art Honor society
Beta Club
Chess Club
Color Guard
Dance Team
Debate Team
DECA
Drama Club
FCA
Film Club
Forensics Team
French Club
Freshman Class
FFA
German Club
Honor Society
Hawks Connection
Health Occupation Students Of America
Honor Council 
Environmental Club
Junior Class
Latin Honor Society
Key Club
Literary Magazine
Math Team
Model United Nations
NHS
National Spanish Honor Society
Newspaper
Photography Club
Robotics Team #1522
Environmental Science Club
Senior Class
Sign Language Club
S.O.S (Serving Our Soldiers)
S.O.D.A
Sophomore Class
Spanish Club
Spirit Club
Student Council Association 
Tri-M Honor Society
W.E.B 
Yearbook
Band
Emerging Leaders
Character Education Program
Marching Band
Orchestra
International Baccalaureate

HHS has two competitive show choirs, the mixed-gender Sound FX and the women's-only Highlights. Along with Mechanicsville High School, Hanover hosts a competitive festival every year.

The Specialty Center at Hanover High School

STEM Electives 

 Electronics I, II, and III
 Engineering I and II
 Design, Multimedia, and Web Technologies

Public Safety Electives 

 Firefighting I and II
 Emergency Medical Technician (EMT) I and II
 Criminal Justice I and II

Health Sciences Electives 

 Nurse Aide I and II
 Pharmacy Technician I and II
 Sports Medicine II

Demographics  
Demographic breakdown of the 1,323 (2016–17) enrolled students:

Female - 50.03%
Male - 49.96%
White - 82.01%
African American - 8.91%
Hispanic - 2.87%
Asian - 2.41%
Native American - 0.30%

Notable alumni
Josh Wells, NFL Offensive Tackle and 2020 Super Bowl Champion
Sam Rogers, NFL fullback
Jonathan Wayne "JJ" Lawhorn

References

External links 
 Hanover County Public Schools Website
 Hanover High School Homepage
 VHSL-Reference website

Public high schools in Virginia
International Baccalaureate schools in Virginia
Schools in Hanover County, Virginia
Educational institutions established in 2003
2003 establishments in Virginia